The Hemshin people, also known as Hemshinli or Hamshenis or Homshetsi, are an bilingual numerically small group of Sunni Muslim Armenians who had been converted from Christianity in the beginning of the 18th century who are affiliated with the Hemşin and Çamlıhemşin districts in the province of Rize, Turkey. They are Armenian in origin, and were originally Christian and members of the Armenian Apostolic Church, but over the centuries evolved into a distinct community and converted to Sunni Islam after the conquest of the region by the Ottomans during the second half of the 15th century.

For centuries, the ongoing migration from the geographically isolated highlands to lowlands made Hemshin people settle in the areas near Trabzon, Artvin and in the Western part of the Black sea coast. Thus, is a significant Hamsheni population were formed in Trabzon, Artvin and Western part of the Black sea coast.

History

Genetic Origin
The origins of the Hemshin people has remained a subject of debate among scholars. The main three purported homelands of the Hemshin have been Eastern Armenia, Western Armenia, or Central Asia. However, the results of a 2011 genetic survey based on the Y-chromosomal markers of the Hemshin indicated the central part of the historical Armenian highlands as a plausible place of origin for the Hamsheni population.

History until the Ottoman conquest
The region of Hemshin is located on the coast of the Black sea, in the highlands of Rize Province. According to historical accounts, Armenians first settled in the that region in the end of 8th century when escaping the Arab persecutions about 12.000 Armenians led by Prince Shapuh Amatuni and his son Hamam moved to Pontos, ruled by Byzantine Empire. Robert H. Hewsen shows the region where today's Hemşin is located to be populated by a people with different designations throughout the ancient and early medieval history. He indicates thereby that some designations may have alternative forms and partially presents the names used with question marks. In summary from 13th century to 6th century BC Colchians, 550 to 330 BC Colchians and Macrones, 180 BC to 14 AD Lazoi (Chani/Tzan tribes), in the Arsacid Period (63–298 AD) Heniochi, Machelones, Heptakometians, Mossynoeci as well as Sanni, Drilae and Macrones are mentioned.

The Hemşin region is shown as part of Colchis (299–387), Tzanica (387–591) and Chaldia (654–750). The specific location of Hemşin is indicated as Tambur/Hamamašen as a fort and town for the first time in the map covering the period 654–750.

Those two names (Tambur and Hamamašen) are included in the History of Taron by John Mamikonean in a short passage about a war between the ruler of Tambur, Hamam, and his maternal uncle the Georgian Prince, which resulted in the destruction of the town to be rebuilt by Hamam and be named after him, namely Hamamshen.

This event is declared by Mamikonian to have taken place in early seventh century. Hamamashen became Hamshen over time. Simonian who conveys this story reports also that the date given by the author may be wrong.

Two other Armenian chronicles Ghewond and Stepanos Asoghik of Taron, report in short passages in their histories about a migration from Armenia/Oshakan led by prince Shapuh Amatuni and his son Hamam. Ghewond conveys this immigration to be to avoid heavy taxes imposed on Armenians by the Arab rulers. The Amatuni lords are offered fertile land to settle down by the Byzantine Emperor, after they crossed the Çoruh. This migration is dated to be after 789 by Ghewond and as 750 by Stephen Asoghik of Taron.

Benninghaus specifies "Tambur" as the destination of the migration led by Hamam and his father Shapuh Amaduni and says that they have seemingly met people there who were already Christians, possibly Greeks. Redgate informs about possible symbolism used in the Ghewond's history and possible garbling in Mamikonian's history, and cautions not to take everything at face value. Hachikian states "There is no clue as to where Tambur, the legendary capital of Hamshen, was located. The only certain thing about it is that it clearly belonged to a much earlier time - if it existed at all". He also mentions in the footnote the name similarity between Tambur and a yayla known as Tahpur or Tagpur, in the heights of Kaptanpasa. Simonian states that Tambur is probably in the vicinity of Varoşkale (altitude 1800 m).

A description of "Haynsen" in the Kingdom of Georgia, its inhabitants and history is contained in La Fleur des histoires de la terre d'Orient by Hayton of Corycus, written around 1307, translated into English in 1520, and later reproduced in the travellers' tales of Samuel Purchas published in 1614. Purchas uses the term "Hamsem" to designate the region and concludes that this is the place of the original Cimmerian gloom of Homer's Odyssey. The translation of He'tum's related passage to modern English uses the term Hamshen. Hayton describes the region to be "miraculous and strange place" unbelievable unless seen by one's own eyes, dark and without roads. Signs of human settlement are that "People in those parts say that one frequently hears the sounds of men bellowing, of cocks crowing, of horses neighing in the forest," Those people are described by Hayton, leaning upon Georgian and Armenian Histories, to be the descendants of the men of the "wicked" Iranian Emperor Shaworeos who had chased and harassed Christian people. The referenced translation suggests this Emperor could be Shapur II (309–379 AD).

Simonian considers the so described difficulty in access not to imply total isolation. On the contrary, he reports, Hamshen served sometimes as a transit route between the coastal regions and the Armenian Highlands. 

In his analysis of the literary and non-literary sources from the 8th through the 19th centuries, combined with excursions into Hamšēn during the 1980s to identify the surviving Armenian architecture, Dr. Robert W. Edwards has defined the geographical perimeters of that region and assessed the historical impact of its extreme isolation.

Sources of the ruling powers in the region, (Byzantine, Trapezuntine, Georgian, Armenian and Turkish) are silent about Hemshin; until the conquest by the Ottomans. It is deduced that Hemşin has been governed by local lords under the umbrella of the greater regional powers changing by the time namely the Bagratid Armenian kingdom, the Byzantine Empire, its successor the Empire of Trebizond, the Kingdom of Georgia, the Kara Koyunlu and Ak Koyunlu Turkmen Confederations until it was annexed by the Ottoman Empire which collapsed as a result of the World War I and gave birth to the Republic of Turkey.

The Ottoman conquest of Hemshin occurred sometime in the 1480s: an Ottoman register dated around 1486 calls it Hemshin and mentions it as being an Ottoman possession.

Turkish dominance and division
Turkish influence was firmly established in the region after the Battle of Manzikert in 1071, after which the Seljuk Turks and other Turkish tribes gained a strong foothold in Central Anatolia and Western Armenian Highlands, often referred to as Eastern Anatolia, bringing the local population in contact with the religion of Islam. In the 15th century, the region of Hamshen was incorporated into the Ottoman Empire. During the Turkish rule, two most important developments are human migrations and conversions. Most sources agree that prior to Ottoman era majority of the residents of Hemshin were Christian and members of the Armenian Apostolic Church. The details and the accompanying circumstances for the migrations and the conversions during the Ottoman era are not clearly known or documented.

As a result of those developments, distinctive communities with the same generic name have also appeared in the vicinity of Hopa, Turkey as well as in the Caucasus. Those three communities are almost oblivious to one another's existence.
The Hemshinli of Hemshin proper (also designated occasionally as western Hemshinli in publications) are Turkish-speaking Sunni Muslims who mostly live in the counties (ilçe) of Çamlıhemşin, Çayeli, İkizdere, Pazar and Hemşin in Turkey's Rize Province.
The Hopa Hemshinli (also designated occasionally as eastern Hemshinli in publications) are Sunni Muslims and mostly live in the Hopa and Borçka counties of Turkey's Artvin Province. In addition to Turkish, they also speak a dialect of western Armenian they call "Homshetsma" or "Hemşince" in Turkish.
Homshentsik (also designated occasionally as Northern Homshentsik in publications) are Christians who live in Georgia and in Russia's Krasnodar Krai. They speak Homshetsma as well. There are also some Muslim Hamshentsi living in Georgia and Krasnodar and some Hamshentsi elements amongst the Meskhetian Turks.

Demographics
Two major developments in the Hemshin region during the Ottoman era: Islamization and population movements. Islam may have begun to spread prior to the Ottoman rule, but it did not become the general religion before the end of the 16th century. A number of population movements (both into and out of the region) also happened during the Ottoman era. Even though detailed information regarding the nature of these movements is missing, in summary:
 some Hemshinli who were members of the Armenian Orthodox Church emigrated to other countries on the eastern Black Sea during the early centuries of Ottoman rule;
 some Muslim Hemshinli migrated to western Anatolia and the Caucasus as a result of the Turco-Russian wars and related hardships during the 19th century;
 some immigration into the area have occurred during Ottoman rule.

The present community of Hemshinli is exclusively Muslim and Turkish speaking. This goes for the people living in Hemshin or people maintaining links to the area and living elsewhere in Turkey.

A distinct community settled about 50 km east of Hemşin in villages around Hopa and Borçka also call themselves "Hemşinli". They are often referred to as the "Hopa Hemşinli". Professor of Linguistics Bert Vaux at the University of Wisconsin-Milwaukee refers to this group as the "Eastern Hamshenis". Hemşinli and Hopa Hemşinli are separated not only by geography but also by language and some features of culture. The two groups are almost oblivious to one another's existence. Simonian reports various theories regarding the appearance of the Hopa Hemshinli group. Those theories relate to whether the groups migrated from Hemshin or they were settled by the Ottoman authorities, whether the migration/settlement was in the early 16th or late 17th centuries, and whether the migration took place in one step or two waves. The Hopa Hemşinli are exclusively Muslim as well.
Simonian reports that there is a controversy regarding whether they arrived in the Hopa region as Muslims or converted to Islam after arrival.

The Hopa Hemşinli speak a language called "Hemşince" or ("Homşetsi" and/or Homshetsma in some sources) as well as Turkish. Recent studies by Hovann Simonian (Author: The Hemshin: A Handbook (Caucasus World)) suggest that this language is an archaic dialect of Armenian subject to influence from Turkish and Laz. Vaux also reports that "Hemşince" has been subject to influence from Turkish to a much greater extent than other Armenian dialects. Hemşince and Armenian are largely mutually unintelligible.

In addition to these two groups there are people speaking Hemşince / Homshetsma in the countries of the former USSR whose ancestors probably originated from Hemşin and/or Hopa Hemşin in course of the various population movements to the Caucasus. Many of the Muslim Hemşince speakers in the former USSR were deported from the Adjara area of Georgia during the Stalin era to Kazakhstan and Kyrgyzstan. Since 1989, a considerable number of these deportees have moved to Krasnodar Krai since 1989, along with the Meskhetian Turks.

Culture

Hemshin peoples are well known for their baking, tea growing, and the clever jokes, riddles, and stories that they tell. Some of the anecdotes that the Muslim Hemshinli tell are actually based on older Armenian ones. They accompany dances with their own brand of music using the tulum (the Pontic bagpipe) (for the Western group), the şimşir kaval (flute made of buxus) (for the Eastern group) or the Hamshna-Zurna (Hamsheni zurna) (for the Northern group). The traditional occupations of the Turkish Hemshinli are cultivating tea and maize, breeding livestock, and beekeeping. The Northern Hamshenis of Russia and Georgia, meanwhile, are primarily known as citrus, corn, tobacco and tea growers as well as fishermen.

The people of Hemshin are known for their traditional dress. Women often choose to wrap their head with a "pushi" or long piece of cloth donned with beads, while men often choose to wear hats and vests made of wool or cotton.

The Hemshin people and their mansions were featured in issue 12 of Cornucopia magazine.

Present situation

Hemşinli in Turkey
The "Turkey for the Turks" ideology, writes Neal Ascherson, "offered no security for minorities" with "the tiny Hemşinli group having especially compelling reasons to keep its head down" because "its members are the descendants of Armenians." Beginning in the 1930s, a number of Turkish historians attempted to ascribe an entirely Turkish origin to the Hemshinli, the most prominent of them being M. Fahrettin Kırzıoğlu, whose theories have since gained wide currency among the community. His theories on the Hemshinli, however, have come under close scrutiny and have been roundly criticized. The German scholars Wolfgang Feurstein and Tucha Berdsena describe Kırzıoğlu's methodology as so:

At first Kırzıoğlu assaults the reader with a flow of historical peoples; he then searches for some kind of phonetic correspondence or similarity with an old Turkish tribe, flavors this alleged historical outpouring with a pinch of "Islam," and presents himself as a competent researcher of Turkishness. Probably never before has a single person in Turkey falsified history so massively!

The filmmaker Özcan Alper, an eastern Hemshinli, made the first motion picture in Homshetsi, Momi ("Grandma"), released in 2000. As a result, Alper was accused in the Court for State Security of producing material intended to destroy the unity of the state, under article 8 of Turkey's anti-terror law. This law was repealed in 2003 after EU pressure, and Alper's trial did not go ahead. Hamsheni singer Gökhan Birben (from the Western group) and Laz singer Kâzım Koyuncu had also sung in Homshetsi. In 2005, the first music album exclusively of anonymous Hamshen folk songs and sung mostly in Homshetsi, Vova - Hamşetsu Ğhağ was released.

Older generations of Turkish Hemshinli see the reference "Ermeni" (often used by their Laz neighbours) as an insult.

Mesut Yılmaz, a former Prime Minister of Turkey, was born in Istanbul to a family with partial Hamsheni (Western group) origins. Ahmet Tevfik İleri (who was born in Yaltkaya (Gomno) village of Hemşin), a Deputy Prime Minister and before that, a Minister of Education in Turkey within successive Adnan Menderes governments between 1950 and 1960, as well as Damat Mehmet Ali Pasha, the Ottoman Grand Vizier on the eve of the Crimean War in 1853 were also of Hamsheni descent. The community issued other important names in Turkish history and society such as Murat Karayalçın, a former Deputy Prime Minister and mayor of Ankara who is from Şenyuva (Çinçiva) village of Çamlıhemşin.

There are two ongoing projects involving Turkish NGOs and EuropeAid, European Commission's external aid instrument, that touch their issues. The more recently (2007) launched "Ecodialogue Project" has set itself as goal raising environment consciousness of the region's enterprises and improving the poor levels and quality of the information relayed by local guides, many of whom are self-styled and unlicensed. The other project, started 2004 and involving also the World Conservation Union, aims to raise the profile and awareness of the grouse, particularly black grouse, who visit the region, also with focus on enterprises and guides.

Hamshenis in Russia and the former Soviet Union
Interest in Hamshen heritage is rising among Christian Hamshenis in the former Soviet Union. In 2006, the first music album in Homshetsma by the Ensemble Caravan was released in Krasnodar. Hamshen Scientific, Information and Cultural Centre began to work on exclusive projects in order to recover the cultural heritage of the Hamshenis living in the region. The Armenian newspaper published in Sukhumi carries the name Hamshen.

During the Mikhail Gorbachev period of the Soviet Union in the late 1980s, the Hamshenis of Kazakhstan began petitioning for the government to move them to the Armenian SSR. However, this move was denied by Moscow because of fears that the Muslim Hamshenis might spark ethnic conflicts with their Christian Armenian brothers.

After the dissolution of the Soviet Union, most Hamshenis lived relatively undisturbed. However, those in the Abkhazia region of Georgia had trouble coping with day-to-day life during the Georgian Civil War.

Since 2000, several hundred of the Muslim Hamshenis in Russia who have resettled from Kazakhstan and Kyrgyzstan to Krasnodar Krai (about 1000 total) have repeatedly attempted to formally receive registration from the local authorities. This is similar and related to the problem of the Meskhetians. These actions have been made difficult by the attitude of the Krasnodar officials. In defiance of the authorities an organisation of their co-ethnics in Armenia have appealed to the Russian ambassador in Yerevan to get Moscow to intervene in this case and overrule the regional officials who seem intent on preventing Hamshenis from gaining a status of permanent residency.

In the 2002 Russian Federation census, 1,542 people identified themselves as Hamshenis, two-thirds of whom were living in Krasnodar Krai.

Recognition by the Armenian mainstream
From October 13 to 15, 2005, a Hamsheni international scientific convention was held in Sochi. The conference was organized under the Institute of History of the Academy of Sciences of Armenia, Russian-Armenian Commonwealth Organization of Moscow (commissioned by the Armenian Revolutionary Federation) with help from the Armenian Scientific Informational and Cultural Center, "Hamshen" (Krasnodar, Russia) and Russian Armenian newspaper Yerkramas. It involved scholars from Armenia, Russia, the United States, Germany, and Iran to discuss the past of the Hamshenis.

Notable Hamshenis

Politicians in Turkey 
Ministers

 Murat Karayalçın (b. 1943) – politician who served as minister of foreign affairs, deputy prime minister, mayor of Ankara and the founder of the SHP.
 Tevfik İleri (1911–1961) – statesman who served as deputy prime minister, minister of national education, minister of public works and minister of transport.
 Mesut Yılmaz (1947–2020) – politician who has held ministerial positions such as minister of culture and tourism, minister of state and deputy prime minister, including prime ministry also chairman of Motherland Party.
Other

 Alper Taş (b. 1967) – socialist politician and leader of Left Party 
 Besim Tibuk (b. 1945) – businessman, liberal politician and chairman of LDP of Laz origin with probably have some Hamsheni roots
 Cihan Alptekin (1947–1972) – political activist, revolutionary and militant who was leader of left-wing organisations such as People's Liberation Army of Turkey and Revolutionary Youth Federation of Turkey.

Popular culture 

 Behçet Gülas (b. 1977) – singer and musician 
 Gökhan Birben 
 Aydoğan Topal (b. 1982) – singer who is half Hamsheni

Tulum artists

 Yaşar Çorbacıoğlu (b. 1939) 
 Remzi Bekar (b. 1937) 
 Dindar Güner (1942–2021)
 Emin Yağcı (b. 1965)
 Mahmut Turan (b. 1958)

Other

 Özcan Alper (b. 1975) – director and screenwriter
 Cemil Aksu (b. 1977) – political and social activist, journalist and ecologist

See also
Amatuni
Armenians in Turkey
Armeno-Tats
Cherkesogai
Christianity in Turkey
Chveneburi
Crypto-Armenians
Empire of Trebizond
Islam in Armenia
Laz people
Minorities in Turkey
Pontic Greeks
Principality of Hamamshen

References

Bibliography

Further reading

External links

, a multi-lingual discussion forum on Hamshen topics.
 An interview with the director of Momi on the film and Hamshenis.

 Features Hamsheni words and their Turkish equivalents.

Ethnic Armenian Muslims
Ethnic groups in Russia
Ethnic groups in Turkey
 
History of Rize Province
Turkish people of Armenian descent